Dumont High School is a four-year comprehensive public high school that serves students in ninth through twelfth grade from Dumont, in Bergen County, New Jersey, United States, operating as the lone secondary school of the Dumont Public Schools.

The school operates under the authority of the New Jersey Department of Education and has been accredited by the Middle States Association of Colleges and Schools Commission on Elementary and Secondary Schools since 1939.

As of the 2021–22 school year, the school had an enrollment of 764 students and 65.1 classroom teachers (on an FTE basis), for a student–teacher ratio of 11.7:1. There were 42 students (5.5% of enrollment) eligible for free lunch and 5 (0.7% of students) eligible for reduced-cost lunch.

History
The current Dumont High School opened in 1932. The original high school was founded in 1918 and located at what is now the Dumont Municipal Building.  In 1961, construction on the current building yielded a new gymnasium, a library, over 20 classrooms, and a cafeteria.  Another addition was added to the school in 2007. A new media center, modern science labs, and an elevator were part of the new construction.

Awards, recognition and rankings
The school was the 101st-ranked public high school in New Jersey out of 339 schools statewide in New Jersey Monthly magazine's September 2014 cover story on the state's "Top Public High Schools", using a new ranking methodology. The school had been ranked 118th in the state of 328 schools in 2012, after being ranked 106th in 2010 out of 322 schools listed. The magazine ranked the school 162nd in 2008 out of 316 schools. The school was ranked 174th in the magazine's September 2006 issue, which surveyed 316 schools across the state. Schooldigger.com ranked the school 179th out of 381 public high schools statewide in its 2011 rankings (an increase of 10 positions from the 2010 ranking) which were based on the combined percentage of students classified as proficient or above proficient on the mathematics (78.0%) and language arts literacy (95.0%) components of the High School Proficiency Assessment (HSPA).

Athletics
The Dumont High School Huskies compete in the Big North Conference, which is comprised of public and private high schools in Bergen and Passaic counties, and was established following a reorganization of sports leagues in Northern New Jersey by the New Jersey State Interscholastic Athletic Association (NJSIAA). Before the NJSIAA realignment, the school had been part of the Bergen County Scholastic League (BCSL) American Conference, which included public and private high schools in Bergen County and Hudson counties. With 611 students in grades 10-12, the school was classified by the NJSIAA for the 2019–20 school year as Group II for most athletic competition purposes, which included schools with an enrollment of 486 to 758 students in that grade range. The football team competes in the American Red division of the North Jersey Super Football Conference, which includes 112 schools competing in 20 divisions, making it the nation's biggest football-only high school sports league. The school was classified by the NJSIAA as Group III North for football for 2018–2020. The school colors are brown, orange and white. The head of the athletic department is Michael Oppido.

The school participates in joint boys / girls swimming teams with New Milford High School as the host school / lead agency. Dumont and Bergenfield High School participate in a co-op ice hockey team with Fair Lawn High School as the host school. These co-op programs operate under agreements scheduled to expire at the end of the 2023–24 school year.

The boys cross country team won the Group III state championship in 1971.

In 1984, the football team finished the season with a 9-2 record after winning its first ever North I, Section II state sectional title, defeating by a score of 23–20 a Hawthorne High School team that had come into the championship game undefeated. In the 71st annual "Turkey Bowl" game on Thanksgiving Day in 2019, Dumont beat Tenafly High School by a score of 7-6 to win its sixth consecutive game in the rivalry and bring the overall series to 56-31-3 in favor of Tenafly.

The 1988 girls track team won the Bergen County relays for groups 1 and 2.

The girls volleyball team finished the 1996 season with a record of 19-7 after winning the Group II state championship against New Milford High School in the final match of the tournament.

In fall 1998, the boys soccer team won the school's first ever Bergen County Tournament soccer game, beating Hackensack High School in penalty kicks, before losing to Bergen Catholic High School in the quarter finals.  The team was named the Small School (Group 1 & 2) Team of the Year by The Bergen Record, finishing the year 18-3-2, setting the school record for wins in a season.

The 1999 boys indoor track team won the Bergen County Indoor Relays championship.

The baseball team won the 2002 North I, Group II state sectional championship, defeating Hoboken High School 4–3 in the tournament final. In 2008, the baseball team won the BCSL American League Championship for the first time since 1988, defeating rival River Dell Regional High School by a score of 5–4 in nine innings. John O'Rourke allowed no earned runs over eight scoreless innings (8 IP, 4 R, 0 ER, 8 H, 6 K, BB).  They finished the year at an overall record of 17–6, losing in the opening round of the North I, Group II State Tournament to Mahwah, 8–3.

Prior to the 2008–09 school year, the district completed renovations of the majority of DHS athletic facilities. The project included the installation of a state-of-the-art six-lane track, artificial FieldTurf playing surface and lights at the high school. In addition, a new baseball and soccer field were installed at Honiss School, while a new softball and soccer field were installed at Selzer School.

In 2009, the girls varsity bowling team were the Bergen County Scholastic League American League Champions for the first time in Dumont's history. The bowling team is coached by Marc Ferrara.

In 2009, the baseball team repeated as BCSL American League champs by defeating River Dell Regional High School 8–0, winning their 11th league title in school history.

In 2010, the Dumont Huskies captured their third straight BSCL American Championship title by defeating Tenafly High School, 8–1. The 2009-10 Dumont boys baseball team, under the direction of head coach Jason Cannici, finished with an overall of record of 20-7 and finished first in the BCSL American at a record of 15–3. They advanced to the semifinals of the North 1, Group 2 State Tournament losing 1–0 to North Warren Regional High School, with the only run of the game scoring on a suicide squeeze.

Music
Dumont High School has been known for its music department. The Dumont High School Marching Band has been performing at the North Jersey High School Band Festival for over 30 years, as one of the largest marching bands in Bergen County. In the past the band has played half-time shows for the New York Jets at Giants Stadium. The concert band and chorus perform music of the highest level and have performed throughout the United States and Canada. At music festivals, throughout the United States, the band has received superior ratings as has the chorus.  The concert band and marching band are well known throughout the Eastern United States. The music department has had a jazz program which encourages and teaches jazz improvisation. In 2017, the Dumont High School Marching Band was nominated by Senator Cory Booker to represent the state of New Jersey in the National Memorial Day Parade in Washington D.C. At this time the band was under the direction of Deanna Loertscher.

Theatre and arts
The Dumont High School proudly produces four productions a year with their Youth Theatre actors. In the fall is the straight play, winter is the London Play, spring is the musical and late spring is the student written and produced One Acts. Such shows included Godspell,  Grease,  Anything Goes, Matchmaker, Romeo and Juliet, Little Shop of Horrors, Midsummer Night's Dream, A Funny Thing Happened on the Way to the Forum, Sweeney Todd: The Demon Barber of Fleet Street, The Two Month Rule, Seussical the Musical, Beauty and the Beast, and Shrek the Musical.

NJDFL
Dumont High School is a member of the New Jersey Drama and Forensics League. The students have the opportunity to compete against other high schools in pair pieces, scenes, monologues, improvisation, speeches and storytelling. Dumont won the championship in 2002, taking home the inaugural Looby Cup. Dumont High School took home the Looby Cup once again in 2010 after accumulating a total of 256 points at a championship tournament at Raritan High School. The team won by a margin of 63 points over second-place finisher Mainland Regional High School. Dumont High School kept the Looby Cup at home after winning the state championships for a second straight time in 2011. Dumont won the team sweepstakes with a total of 235 points, only 5 points more than second-place finisher Absegami High School.

Administration
The school's principal is James Wichmann. His administration team includes two assistant principals.

Notable alumni

 Dominick Barlow (born 2003), professional basketball player who currently plays for the San Antonio Spurs under a two-way contract with the Austin Spurs of the NBA G League.
 John Battaglia (1955-2018), convicted murderer who was executed by the state of Texas for killing his two daughters in 2001 in an act of revenge against his estranged wife.
 Rich Edson (born c. 1981), Fox News Channel correspondent.
 Sean Lissemore (born 1986), defensive tackle for the San Diego Chargers.
 Kevin McMullan (born 1968), former professional baseball player who is an assistant coach for the Virginia Cavaliers baseball team.
 Thomas Nozkowski (1944–2019, class of 1961), contemporary painter.
 Jerry Palmieri (born 1958), football strength and conditioning coach, who was on the staff for the New York Giants.
 Geoff Rickly (born 1979), lead singer of the band Thursday.

References

External links 
Dumont High School
Dumont Public Schools

School Data for the Dumont Public Schools, National Center for Education Statistics

1918 establishments in New Jersey
Educational institutions established in 1918
Dumont, New Jersey
Middle States Commission on Secondary Schools
Public high schools in Bergen County, New Jersey